"Save My Night" is a song by Dutch disc jockey and record producer Armin van Buuren. The song was released in the Netherlands by Armada Music on 6 January 2014 as the fifth single from van Buuren's fifth studio album Intense. The song is only included in the deluxe edition of the album titled "More Intense Edition".

It was the official music track of "Enjoy Heineken Responsibly " 2014 publicity campaign.

Music video
A music video to accompany the release of "Save My Night" was first released onto YouTube on 6 January 2014. The music video was shot in Miami, Florida. It shows Armin van Buuren arriving incognito in a Miamian night bar where the atmosphere seems negative. He decides to uncover himself and to get on stage. He starts to play the chorus of the song which makes people reacting to the music. The music video was released in the context of the "Enjoy Heineken Responsibly" 2014 campaign.

Track listing
 Digital download / CD single 
 "Save My Life" (radio edit) – 2:52

 Digital download 
 "Save My Life" (original mix) – 5:37

 Digital download – Blasterjaxx remix 
 "Save My Night" (Blasterjaxx remix) – 5:26

 Digital download – Blasterjaxx remixes 
 "Save My Night" (Blasterjaxx radio edit) – 3:28
 "Save My Night" (Blasterjaxx remix) – 5:26

 Digital download – remixes 
 "Save My Night" (Allen Watts remix) – 7:31
 "Save My Night" (MaRLo remix) – 5:36

 Digital download – Mark Sixma remix 
 "Save My Life" (Mark Sixma remix) – 5:20

 Digital download – Mark Sixma remixes 
 "Save My Night" (Mark Sixma radio edit) – 3:38
 "Save My Night" (Mark Sixma remix) – 5:20

 Digital download – Andrew Rayel remix 
 "Save My Night" (Andrew Rayel remix) – 5:47

 Digital download – Andrew Rayel remixes 
 "Save My Night" (Andrew Rayel radio edit) – 3:26
 "Save My Night" (Andrew Rayel remix) – 5:47

Charts

References 

2014 singles
Armin van Buuren songs
2014 songs
Songs written by Armin van Buuren
Armada Music singles
Songs written by Benno de Goeij